Michael Thomas Bradley (born April 18, 1979) is an American former professional basketball player and businessman. He is a 6 ft 10 in (2.08 m), 235 lb (107 kg), power forward/center born in Worcester, Massachusetts.

After attending Burncoat High School, he accepted a scholarship to play college basketball at the University of Kentucky. After his sophomore season at Kentucky, Bradley transferred to Villanova University where he started. That season he averaged 20.8 points per game and 9.8 rebounds per game.

Even though he had one year of college eligibility remaining, Bradley left school to go to the NBA in 2001 and was selected as the 17th pick in the 1st round of the NBA Draft by the Toronto Raptors. During his rookie season, Bradley averaged 1.2 points per game and 0.9 rebounds per game. His statistics improved in 2002–03 (5 ppg and 6 rpg in 20 minutes), but in the following season was sidelined constantly with a right knee injury. He was let go by the Raptors in March 2004, and would later be signed by the Atlanta Hawks. In 2004–05 he started off with the Orlando Magic, but was traded twice during that season, to the Sacramento Kings and the Philadelphia 76ers. Played 46 games with the Sixers in 2005–06, his best in two years, mainly because of constant injuries to Chris Webber.

Bradley's final NBA game was played on April 19th, 2006 in a 86 - 96 loss to the Charlotte Bobcats where he recorded 4 points, 2 assists and 1 rebound.

In the 2006–07 season he signed for Bruesa GBC in the Spanish ACB.
After spending one season with the Spanish team, Bradley moved to Germany and signed with ALBA Berlin in August but was released in November. He did not stay unemployed for long, signing with Lithuanian power Žalgiris on November 15. However, he was limited by injuries, averaging only 7 points and 4.9 rebounds in seven games.

On March 10, 2008, Bradley signed with CB Granada of the ACB to play the rest of the season.

Bradley is married to Ellen Bradley (née Suetholz), a top NCAA women's tennis player whom he met at Villanova University, and has three daughters: Taylor Rose, Kya Melat, and Shae. Ellen was instrumental in starting the Michael Bradley Family Foundation  and is the owner of 3 MODO Hot Yoga studios in the States. Modo Yoga Northern Kentucky was the 1st of the MODO community studios to open in the US.

In 2010 Bradley was hired by the Summit Country Day School in Cincinnati, Ohio to be the coach of the Silver Knights boys varsity basketball team.

In March 2012, Bradley coached the Silver Knights to the D3 OHSAA State Championship, defeating Portsmouth High School 53–37.

Bradley and his wife now spend most of the year traveling abroad, as they "world-school" their 3 daughters.

Career statistics

NBA

Regular season

|-
| align="left" | 2001–02
| align="left" | Toronto
| 26 || 0 || 4.5 || .520 || .000 || .500 || 0.9 || 0.1 || 0.0 || 0.2 || 1.2
|-
| align="left" | 2002–03
| align="left" | Toronto
| 67 || 11 || 19.6 || .481 || .167 || .522 || 6.1 || 1.0 || 0.2 || 0.5 || 5.0
|-
| align="left" | 2003–04
| align="left" | Toronto
| 5 || 0 || 7.6 || .333 || .000 || .500 || 2.2 || 0.2 || 0.2 || 0.0 || 0.6
|-
| align="left" | 2003–04
| align="left" | Atlanta
| 11 || 1 || 5.5 || .500 || .000 || .000 || 1.1 || 0.0 || 0.2 || 0.0 || 1.1
|-
| align="left" | 2004–05
| align="left" | Orlando
| 8 || 0 || 6.9 || .429 || .000 || .000 || 1.8 || 0.3 || 0.1 || 0.3 || 0.8
|-
| align="left" | 2004–05
| align="left" | Sacramento
| 8 || 0 || 6.0 || .667 || .000 || .333 || 1.4 || 0.3 || 0.0 || 0.0 || 2.3
|-
| align="left" | 2004–05
| align="left" | Philadelphia
| 2 || 0 || 8.0 || .800 || .000 || .500 || 1.5 || 0.5 || 0.0 || 0.0 || 4.5
|-
| align="left" | 2005–06
| align="left" | Philadelphia
| 46 || 1 || 8.0 || .405 || .200 || .667 || 2.3 || 0.4 || 0.1 || 0.2 || 1.5
|- class="sortbottom"
| style="text-align:center;" colspan="2"| Career
| 173 || 13 || 11.7 || .477 || .143 || .511 || 3.4 || 0.5 || 0.1 || 0.3 || 2.8
|}

Playoffs

|-
| align="left" | 2001–02
| align="left" | Toronto
| 1 || 0 || 3.0 || .000 || .000 || .000 || 1.0 || 1.0 || 0.0 || 0.0 || 0.0
|}

College

|-
| align="left" | 1997–98
| align="left" | Kentucky
| 32 || 0 || 6.9 || .667 || .000 || .514 || 1.7 || 0.5 || 0.2 || 0.5 || 2.4
|-
| align="left" | 1998–99
| align="left" | Kentucky
| 37 || 37 || 21.9 || .657 || .000 || .455 || 4.9 || 1.0 || 0.8 || 0.8 || 9.8
|-
| align="left" | 2000–01
| align="left" | Villanova
| 31 || 31 || 34.0 || .692 || .353 || .590 || 9.8 || 2.6 || 0.9 || 1.8 || 20.8
|- class="sortbottom"
| style="text-align:center;" colspan="2"| Career
| 100 || 68 || 20.9 || .677 || .353 || .541 || 5.4 || 1.3 || 0.6 || 1.0 || 10.9
|}

References

External links
NBA.com Profile
basketball-reference.com Profile
College Stats

1979 births
Living people
Alba Berlin players
All-American college men's basketball players
American expatriate basketball people in Canada
American expatriate basketball people in Denmark
American expatriate basketball people in Germany
American expatriate basketball people in Lithuania
American expatriate basketball people in Spain
Atlanta Hawks players
Basketball players from Worcester, Massachusetts
BC Žalgiris players
CB Granada players
Eastern Kentucky Colonels men's basketball coaches
Gipuzkoa Basket players
High school basketball coaches in Ohio
Kentucky Wildcats men's basketball players
Liga ACB players
Orlando Magic players
Philadelphia 76ers players
Power forwards (basketball)
Sacramento Kings players
Toronto Raptors draft picks
Toronto Raptors players
Villanova Wildcats men's basketball players
American men's basketball players